Motibanugar is a village situated on Jamnagar Rajkot highway, 18 km away from Jamnagar in India. The village has a population of around 4500.

Religion 
The village has main four temples of god and goddess:
 Ma Kumarika 
 Great Hanumanji 
 Mahadevji and Surapura bapa 
 Khimabapa (SHAPARIA FAMILY)

Education and economy
There are three primary schools in village 

 government primary school, 
 Akshardeep vidyalay, 
 Shreyas vidyalay. 

Secondary and higher secondary schools are also in the  village. 

The main occupation of the people is agriculture and other subsidiary depends on the same. More than 70% of villagers are educated. People are dispersed in all the fields like agriculture, Revenue, defense, teaching, politics, IT and many more. Few peoples are businessman, government workers, and professional too.

References

Villages in Jamnagar district